C56 or C-56 may refer to:
 C-56 (Michigan county highway)
 , an Admirable-class minesweeper of the Mexican Navy
 Caldwell 56, a planetary nebula
 Hexachlorocyclopentadiene, an organochlorine compound
 JNR Class C56, a class of Japanese steam locomotive
 Lockheed C-56 Lodestar, an American military aircraft
 Ovarian cancer
 Sickness Insurance (Sea) Convention, 1936 of the International Labour Organization
 Two Knights Defense, a chess opening